Balanbale or Balanballe may refer to:

Balanbale, Togdheer, a town in the Togdheer region of Somaliland
Balanbale district, in Galguduud region of Somalia